The Caribbean water resource region is one of 21 major geographic areas, or regions, in the first level of classification used by the United States Geological Survey to divide and sub-divide the United States into successively smaller hydrologic units. These geographic areas contain either the drainage area of a major river, or the combined drainage areas of a series of rivers.

This region includes the drainage within: (a) the Commonwealth of Puerto Rico; (b) the Virgin Islands of the United States; and (c) other United States Caribbean outlying areas. Includes Caribbean land areas over which the United States has some degree of interest, jurisdiction, or sovereignty.

List of water resource subregions

See also 

 List of rivers in the United States
 Water resource region

References 

Lists of drainage basins
Drainage basins
Watersheds of the United States
Regions of the United States
Resource
Water resource regions